Simon Kassaye (born May 19, 1985) is a Canadian former soccer player who played with the Edmonton Aviators, and with the Canadian national team program.

Playing career 
He played in the Alberta Major Soccer League with Edmonton Victoria. In 2004, Kassaye signed his first professional contract with expansion franchise Edmonton Aviators of the USL A-League. In total he would appear in ten matches for the organization. The team subsequently folded after 2004 season after finishing sixth in the Western Conference, and failed to qualify for the playoffs.

International career 
Kassaye made his debut for Canada U-17 national team on April 18, 2001 in the 2001 CONCACAF U-17 Tournament match against El Salvador. On January 26, 2005 he made his debut for the Canada U-20 national team in the 2005 CONCACAF U-20 Tournament in a match against Mexico.

References

External links 
 

1985 births
Living people
Canada men's youth international soccer players
Canadian soccer players
Edmonton Aviators / F.C. players
Soccer players from Edmonton
A-League (1995–2004) players
Association footballers not categorized by position